is an omnibus television series which features the cast of the several live action series produced along the years in the Garo metaseries, celebrating its 10th anniversary. It aired between April 8 and June 24, 2016.

Setting
The series is a collection of individual episodes featuring characters from the previous installments of the Garo franchise, each of them narrated by Yukijiro Hotaru, reprising his role as Gonza Kurahashi.

Episodes

Cast
: 
: 
: 
: 
: 
: 
:  
: 
: 
: 
: 
: 
: 
: 
: 
: 
: 
: 
: 
: 
: 
: 
: 
: 
: .
: 
: 
, : 
: 
: 
: 
: 
: 
: 
Next Preview Narrator, :

Theme songs
Opening theme

Composition & Arrangement: Yoshichika Kuriyama, Shiho Terada
Ending theme

Lyrics: Masami Okui
Composition: Hironobu Kageyama
Arrangement: Yoshichika Kuriyama, Shiho Terada
Artist: Makai Kagekidan

References

External links
Official website 
Official website at TV Tokyo 

Garo (TV series)
Tokusatsu television series
Japanese horror fiction television series
Martial arts television series
TV Tokyo original programming